Hostouň is a municipality and village in Kladno District in the Central Bohemian Region of the Czech Republic. It has about 1,400 inhabitants.

Sport
The municipality is home to the football club Sokol Hostouň, which plays in the Bohemian Football League (3rd tier of the Czech football league system).

References

Villages in Kladno District